The Drill may refer to:

 The Drill (Avatar: The Last Airbender), the 33rd episode of Avatar: The Last Airbender
 The Drill (album) by Wire
 Matt Schwartz (born 1971), United Kingdom DJ, also known as The Drill
 The Drill (band), house music group of UK producer Matt Schwartz